Kattiyanenthal is a village in Ramanathapuram district, Tamil Nadu state, in southern India.

Villages in Ramanathapuram district